The National Pediatric Hospital of Cambodia (NPH) is a government-run pediatric hospital located in Phnom Penh.  The hospital is managed by the Ministry of Health.  As of March 2009 there were 100 doctors and 225 nurses on the hospital staff.

See also
 Government of Cambodia
 Health in Cambodia

References

Children's hospitals in Cambodia
Buildings and structures in Phnom Penh
Child-related organisations in Cambodia